Peter Borlase (born 22 May 1985) is a New Zealand rugby union former player and former head coach of the Colorado Raptors in Major League Rugby (MLR).

Playing career

Canterbury and Crusaders

He has played 33 times for Canterbury in the ITM Cup.
Being behind the Franks brothers, Ben and Owen, in the pecking order for the Crusaders he only made 2 Super Rugby appearances.

Pro 12

In June 2010, Borlase joined Munster on a 2-year contract. He was signed as a project player, meaning he would make himself available to play for Ireland once qualified to by 3 years residency. He made his Munster début on 16 November 2010 against a touring Australia side and made 7 appearances in the 2010/11 season.

Borlase joined Irish province Connacht on loan in February 2012, to gain match time following injuries and to provide cover at prop. He made his debut for Connacht against Scarlets on 2 March 2012.

He was recalled from his loan at Connacht and added to Munster's 2011–12 Heineken Cup squad in March 2012.
His contract was not extended by Munster and he left once his two-year contract expired.

Hawke's Bay

After leaving Munster, Borlase returned to New Zealand and joined Hawke's Bay to compete in the ITM Cup.

Coaching career

In September 2013, Borlase signed on to coach Gernika RT, in the Spanish League.

Borlase was the head coach of the Denver Barbarians RFC, and an assistant coach with the Denver Stampede. In June 2019 he became Head Coach of the Glendale Raptors

References

External links
Crusaders profile
Munster profile

New Zealand rugby union coaches
New Zealand rugby union players
1985 births
Living people
Rugby union players from Christchurch
Canterbury rugby union players
Crusaders (rugby union) players
Munster Rugby players
Connacht Rugby players
Hawke's Bay rugby union players
New Zealand expatriate rugby union players
New Zealand expatriate sportspeople in Ireland
Expatriate rugby union players in Ireland
Rugby union props